The Kankakee Kanks were a minor league baseball team located in Kankakee, Illinois. Kankakee teams played a member of the Class D level Northern Association in 1910, playing as the Kankakee "Kays" and the Illinois-Missouri League from 1912 to 1914. The Kankakee teams hosted home minor league games on the grounds of the Kankakee State Hospital.

Baseball Hall of Fame inductee Casey Stengel played for the 1910 Kankakee Kays, beginning his first professional season.

History

Northern Association 1910
Minor league baseball began in Kankakee, Illinois in 1910. The Kankakee Kays became charter members of the Class D level Northern Association. The Clinton Teddies, Decatur Commodores, Elgin Kittens, Freeport Pretzels, Jacksonville Jacks, Joliet Jolly-ites and Muscatine Pearl Finders Joined Kankakee as the charter members of the eight–team league, which began play on May 10,1910.

In their first season of minor league play, the Kankakee franchise folded during the season. On July 11, 1910, the Kankakee Kays were in 3rd place with a 34–24 record under manager Dan Collins when the franchise disbanded. The Elgin Kittens franchise disbanded on the same day. The Northern Association completely disbanded on July 17, 1910.

Casey Stengel

Baseball Hall of Fame inductee Casey Stengel made his professional debut for the Kays on May 10, 1910. At age 19, Stengel hit .251 with one home run in 59 games for Kankakee. 

In talking about playing in Kankakee Casey Stengel said, "We did not draw (fans) and getting paid was quite an adventure." Stengel had claimed he received only half of his $135 per month check when Kankakee had folded in July, 1910. Years later, at his birthday party in 1956, the Kankakee Federal Savings and Loan Association presented Stengel with a check. The check was for $483.05, calculated off the original $67.50 owed, plus interest over 46 years. Stengel donated the gift to the Kankakee Little League.

Illinois–Missouri League 1912 to 1914

After the Kankakee Kays folded following the 1910 season, minor league baseball returned for the 1912 season. On May 16, 1912, the Clinton Champs from Clinton, Iowa, members of the Illinois-Missouri League, moved the franchise to Kankakee with a 2–5 record. The Mississippi River flood of 1912 corresponds with the Clinton franchise relocation that year.

Playing the remainder of the 1912 season as the Kankakee Kanks, the team compiled a record of 54–51 while based in Kankakee. The Clinton/Kankakee team finished with an overall record of 56–56, placing fourth in the 1912 Illinois-Missouri League playing under managers Claude Suttles and Fred Wilson. The Kanks joined Illinois–Missouri League members Canton Highlanders, Champaign Velvets, Lincoln Abes, Pekin Celestials and Streator Speedboys in 1912 league play.

Continuing play in the 1913 Illinois–Missouri League, the Kanks finished in third place. With a 35–51 record under manager Red Kelly, Kankakee finished the season 23.5 games behind the 1st place Lincoln Abes in the six–team league final standings. A.J. Holtzhouser of Kankakee led the Illinois-Missouri League with 118 total hits.

In their final season of minor league play, the Kankakee Kanks folded during the 1914 season. On July 3, 1914, Kankakee had a record of 14–33 when the franchise permanently disbanded. At the time they folded, Kankakee was 17.5 games behind the 1st place Lincoln Abes, who folded the same day. Kankakee played in 1914 under managers Harry Randall, Gene Connelly, Teddy Raines and William Hinley. The Illinois–Missouri League finished the 1914 season without the Kankakee and Lincoln teams.

The Illinois–Missouri League permanently disbanded after the 1914 season. Kankakee, Illinois has not hosted another minor league team.

The ballpark
Kankakee minor league teams played home games at the ballpark adjacent to the Kankakee State Hospital. The ballpark had hosted a game featuring the Leland Giants against a hospital sponsored team in 1907. Because of the ballpark location, patients at the hospital could watch games from the hospital windows. Today, the hospital location is 100 E. Jeffery Street.

Timeline

Year–by–year records

Notable alumni

 Casey Stengel (1910) Inducted Baseball Hall of Fame, 1966
George Hale (1912)
Elmer Jacobs (1912)
Bobby Veach (1910) 3x AL RBI leader
Bob Wright (1913)

See also
Kankakee Kanks playersKankakee Kays players

References

External links
Baseball Reference

Kankakee, Illinois
Defunct minor league baseball teams
Defunct baseball teams in Illinois
Baseball teams established in 1912
Baseball teams disestablished in 1914
1912 establishments in Illinois
1914 disestablishments in Illinois
Defunct sports teams in Illinois
Professional baseball teams in Illinois
Illinois-Missouri League teams